Yarrawonga South is a locality directly south of Yarrawonga in Northern Victoria. Its local government area is the Shire of Moira.

References

Towns in Victoria (Australia)
Shire of Moira